The Asian Beau Stakes is a Perth Racing Group 3 Thoroughbred horse race held under quality handicap conditions, for horses aged three years old and upwards, over a distance of 1400 metres at Ascot Racecourse, Perth, Western Australia in late October or early November. Prize money is A$150,000.

History

 In 2003 the race was run at Belmont Park Racecourse.

Name
Nitro Lad won the inaugural event which was known as the WATC Kankama Quality Stakes. It was also known as the WATC Belmont Community Quality Stakes, WATC Budget Quality Stakes, WATC Singapore Quality and as the Asian Beau Stakes since 1995.

The race is named after the champion sprinter/miler Asian Beau, who raced in the late 1970s early 1980s, winning 12 of 18 starts including the 1979 Railway Stakes.

Grade
1985–1998 - Listed race
1999 onwards - Group 3

Distance
1985–1992 – 1200 metres
1993 onwards - 1400 metres

Double winners
Six horses have completed the Asian Beau–Railway Stakes double: 
Bold Extreme (1996), Willoughby (1998), El Presidente (2007), Lucky Gray (2011), Galaxy Star (2018) and Inspirational Girl (2020)

Winners

 2021 - Western Empire
 2020 - Inspirational Girl
 2019 - Samizdat
 2018 - Galaxy Star
 2017 - Pounamu
 2016 - Heart Starter
 2015 - Real Love
 2014 - Balmont Girl
 2013 - Platinum Rocker
 2012 - Westriver Kevydonn
 2011 - Luckygray
 2010 - Colour Correct
 2009 - Kasabian
 2008 - Gilded Venom
 2007 - El Presidente
 2006 - Idyllic Prince
 2005 - Wild Target
 2004 - Rock Of Cashel
 2003 - Track Jester
 2002 - Suspicion
 2001 - Old Fashion
 2000 - Fair Alert
 1999 - Umah  
 1998 - Willoughby
 1997 - Look Of Success
 1996 - Bold Extreme
 1995 - Lynsted Lad
 1994 - Classy Dresser
 1993 - Asian Incline
 1992 - Pago Escort
 1991 - Future Edition
 1990 - Crimson Medal
 1989 - Medicine Kid
 1988 - Ableson
 1987 - Power Prince
 1986 - Fimiston
 1985 - Coal Pak
 1984 - Paragon of Virtue
 1983 - Questilla
 1982 - Nitro Lad

See also

 List of Australian Group races
 Group races

References

Horse races in Australia
Sport in Perth, Western Australia